Florin Sorin Lehaci (born 26 March 1999) is a Romanian rower. He competed in the men's eight event at the 2020 Summer Olympics.

References

External links
 

1999 births
Living people
Romanian male rowers
Olympic rowers of Romania
Rowers at the 2020 Summer Olympics
Sportspeople from Câmpulung